Michał Jerzy Misiewicz (born October 11, 1990) is a Canadian former soccer player. He has represented Canada at under-17, under-20 and under-23 level. Michal now coaches GK's in Calgary, AB, Canada and runs his own GK Academy.

Early life and career
Misiewicz was born in the Greek capital of Athens to Polish parents, and then the family moved to Alberta in Canada. Misiewicz left his home at the age of 14 to pursue a career in Europe and spent a year in Germany with SSV Jahn Regensburg. He moved to Polish club Śląsk Wrocław in 2006 and six months later travelled to England with his coach, who had received a job offer there. Misiewicz had a successful trial with Football League Championship club Plymouth Argyle during the spring of 2007 and signed a two-year apprenticeship in June. Under the guidance of Rhys Wilmot, he helped the club's under-18 side reach the quarter-finals of the FA Youth Cup and win the South West Conference of the Football League Youth Alliance during the 2007–08 season. Misiewicz joined Premier League side Sunderland in the summer of 2008 and won Group D of the Premier Academy League in his first season with the club. He signed a one-year professional contract in 2009, and spent a season playing for the club's reserve team. He was released at the end of the 2009–10 campaign.

Misiewicz joined Blyth Spartans for the 2013 season following solid performances in a set of pre-season friendlies. He made his competitive debut at Witton Albion and saved a first half penalty to contribute to a 1–0 victory with the Spartans down to 9 men.

Club career

Polonia Bytom
In July 2010, he signed a three-year contract with Polonia Bytom.

FC Edmonton
In March 2012, Misiewicz joined North American Soccer League club FC Edmonton.

International career
Misiewicz was a member of the Canadian U-17, U-20 and U-23 (Olympic team) national teams.

He has also represented Alberta numerous times during Provincial and Canadian National Championships and was successful winning the U-13 Championships in the 2003 season with Southern Alberta, coming in 4th at the National Championships with the U-14 Alberta team in 2004 and winning the U-16 National Championship with team Alberta for the 2006 title and even scoring in the final game with a confident penalty shot.

Misiewicz was given the starting keeping position with the Canada U23 team during the 2012 CONCACAF Men's Olympic Qualifying Tournament. He played in all four matches, including a 2–0 win over the United States in the group stage and was named MVP against El Salvador in a 0–0 draw, however Canada failed to qualify.

References

External links
 

1990 births
Living people
Canadian soccer players
Association football goalkeepers
SSV Jahn Regensburg players
Śląsk Wrocław players
Plymouth Argyle F.C. players
Sunderland A.F.C. players
Polonia Bytom players
FC Edmonton players
North American Soccer League players
Canadian people of Polish descent
Canadian expatriate soccer players
Canadian expatriates in Poland
Expatriate footballers in Poland
Canada men's youth international soccer players
Canada men's under-23 international soccer players
Blyth Spartans A.F.C. players
Footballers from Athens
Greek footballers
Canadian expatriate sportspeople in England